Hazrat Ishan Hazrat Shaykh Yaqub Sarfi Kashmiri (1521–1595), popularly known as "Ishan Sahib" was a Kashmiri Muslim Scholar, Mutasawif, Faqih, poet, author, artist, Mufassir, Muhaddith, philosopher, theologian and Sufi shaykh of the Kubrawiyyah order.

Early life 
Yaqub born in Srinagar to Syakh Mir Hassan Ghani, who was also a scholar. At the age of six or seven he memorized the Quran and started composing its verses in Persian. At nineteen he completed his education under Mawlana Bashir and Mawlana Aini, and he later became the student of Mawlana Abdur Rehman, an Iranian Sufi and poet. Jami gave him the title "Jami-as-Sani" (second Jami), when he got impressed by Sarfi. He then travelled to Central Asia where he received spiritual guidance under Shaykh Kamal Ud Din Hussain Khawarizmi. They both went for pilgrimage (makkah) and he joined the seminar of Ibn Hajar, where he sharpened his knowledge of Quran and Hadith. And after returning from Makkah to Delhi, he met with Mujadid i Alf-i-Sani Sahykh Ahmad Sirhindi and gave him "Ijazat namah"  of sacred hadiths and "Irshad namah" of Kubrawiyyah order. Badhauni mentioned him in connection of Ibaadat khana.

Works 
 Sharh-i-Bukhari, a Persian commentary on Shaykh Muhammad Ismail Al Bukhari's Book Sahih al-Bukhari
 Matlabul Talibin-fi-Tafsir-i-Kalam-i-Rab-Ul-Almin (Tafsir)
 Diwan-e-Sarfi
 Manasik Ul Hajj, (rules and regulations of pilgrimage in Arabic)
 Risalay-i-Zikriya (importance of zikr)
 Diwan, (Ghazals and Rubayat's Collection)
 Sawati-Ul-Ilham
 Kunz Al Jawahir
 Risala e Azkar
 The five Masnavis:
 Maghaz-u-nabi
 Maslakhul Akhyar
 Makamatil Murshid
 Wamiq Azra
 Laila Majnun

Personal life
At the age of 25 he married and had a son named Muhammad Yusuf who died at early age.

Death 
When Shaykh Yaqub left Lahore for Kashmir and didn't go back to court again, on 08 Dhul Qadah 1003 AH/1595 A.D. Badhayuni Paid him warm tribute on his death by following chronogram: "He was the Shaykh of the nations". He was buried in Zaina Kadal Srinagar.

See also 
Ahmad Sirhindi

Mir Sayyid Ali Hamadani

References

1521 births
1595 deaths
Kashmiri poets